Abū al-ʽAbbās Aḥmad ibn Muḥammad ibn ʽIḏārī al-Marrākushī was a Moroccan historian of the late-13th/early-14th century,  and author of the famous Al-Bayan al-Mughrib, an important medieval history of the Maghreb (Morocco, North Africa) and Al-Andalus (now the Iberian Peninsula) written in 1312.

Ibn Idhāri was born and lived in Marrakech, Morocco, and was a qāʾid ('commander') of Fez. Little is known of his life.  His only surviving work, Al-Bayan al-Mughrib, is a history of North Africa from the conquest of Miṣr in 640/1 AD to the Almohad conquests in 1205/6 AD. Its value to modern scholarship lies in its extracts from older works, now lost, and in its material not found elsewhere, including reports of the first Viking raids on Al-Andalus in the ninth century. He mentions another biographic work on the caliphs, imāms and amīrs from across the Islamic world, which has not survived.  He died after 1312 / 712 AH.

Notes

References
Ahmed Siraj: L'Image de la Tingitane. L'historiographie arabe médiévale et l'Antiquité nord-africaine. École Française de Rome, 1995. . Short biographical note.
 N. Levtzion & J.F.P. Hopkins, Corpus of early Arabic sources for West African history, Cambridge University Press, 1981,  (reprint: Markus Wiener, Princeton, 2000). Short biographical note and English translation of extracts from Al-Bayan al-Mughrib.

13th-century Moroccan historians
14th-century Arabic writers
14th-century Moroccan historians
People from Marrakesh
Historians from the Marinid Sultanate